The 2004 Bridgend County Borough Council election was held on Thursday 10 June 2004 to Bridgend County Borough Council, Wales. It took place on the same day as other council elections in Wales and England. It was preceded by the 1999 election and followed by the 2008 election.

The election resulted in the Labour Party losing control of the council.

Overview
54 council seats were up for election, across 39 electoral wards, a similar number to the previous election in 1999.

Labour had a strong majority on the council prior to the election, though council leader Jeff Jones had recently stood down from his position.

Election result

Labour lost 18 seats at the election, though remained the largest party. The following week, Liberal Democrat Cheryl Green announced she would lead a coalition Lib Dems, Conservatives and Independents.

|}

Ward Results
Contests took place in 37 of the 39 wards, with councillors in two of the wards being elected unopposed.

Aberkenfig (one seat)

Bettws (one seat)

Blackmill (one seat)

Blaengarw (one seat)

Brackla (four seats)

Bryncethin (one seat)

Bryncoch (one seat)

Bryntirion, Laleston and Merthyr Mawr (two seats)

Caerau (three seats)

Cefn Cribwr (one seat)

Cefn Glas (one seat)

Coity (one seat)

Cornelly (two seats)

Coychurch Lower (one seat)

Felindre (one seat)

Hendre (two seats)

Litchard (one seat)

Llangeinor (one seat)

Llangewydd and Brynhyfryd (one seat)

Llangynwyd (one seat)

Maesteg East (two seats)

Maesteg West (two seats)

Morfa (two seats)

Nant-y-moel (one seat)

Newcastle (two seats)

Newton (one seat)

Nottage (one seat)

Ogmore Vale (one seat)

Oldcastle (two seats)

Pendre (one seat)

Penprysg (one seat)

Pen-y-fai (one seat)

Pontycymmer (one seat)

Porthcawl East Central (one seat)

Porthcawl West Central (one seat)

Pyle (three seats)

Rest Bay (one seat)

Sarn (one seat) 

The vote was postponed in this ward until 22 July.

Ynysawdre (one seat) 

* retiring councillor in the ward standing for re-election

References

Bridgend County Borough Council elections
Bridgend